Brett Dudley Hulsey (born April 28, 1959) is a consultant, Democratic Party politician and legislator in Wisconsin.

Background
Hulsey earned a B.A. in political economy from Middlebury College in 1982, and an M.S. in  natural science from the University of Oklahoma in 1988. He is the owner of an energy and environmental consulting firm. He has served as a Dane County supervisor since 1998.

Personal life
As of 2013 he had been married to Mary Kay for 19 years; they have one son (Tyler) and one daughter (Lea). On February 7, 2013 his wife filed for divorce.  He was issued a citation by Madison Police Department on July 12, 2012, for disorderly conduct at a Spring Harbor Beach on Lake Mendota in the City of Madison, on July 4, 2012. Hulsey pleaded no contest to the charge in court on August 15, 2012.

Legislative career
Hulsey was elected to the Wisconsin State Assembly's 77th district in 2010 to succeed fellow Democrat Spencer Black, receiving a plurality of 12,138 votes to 7,761 for Green Ben Manski, 4,666 for Republican David Redick, and 372 for David Olson of the Constitution Party. This was one of only two races in the state where, in an election contested by both major parties, the first and second places were not taken by a Republican and a Democrat. The other was the 25th Assembly district, where the former Democratic incumbent successfully ran as an independent against candidates from both major parties.

After a redistricting by the Republican-controlled legislature, the 77th Assembly District boundaries were moved to the east. Since fellow Democrat Mark Pocan was running for Tammy Baldwin's Congressional seat, Hulsey ran in the modified 78th Assembly district. As in the 2010 race, the only serious challenge to the Democratic candidate in the 78th was a Green candidate, Jonathan Dedering (officially running as an independent); the Republicans did not even field a candidate. Hulsey won with 22,853 votes to 7323 for Dedering. The revamped 77th District was in turn taken without opposition by Terese Berceau (another Democrat), who had previously represented the 76th district.

Run for governor 
On April 21, 2014, Hulsey announced that instead of seeking re-election, he was running for governor in the Democratic primary. He faced Mary Burke in the primary, but drew criticism when he protested the 2014 Wisconsin Republican Party Convention, calling Governor Scott Walker's agenda racist.

References

1959 births
County supervisors in Wisconsin
Democratic Party members of the Wisconsin State Assembly
Middlebury College alumni
Living people
University of Oklahoma alumni
21st-century American politicians
Candidates in the 2014 United States elections
20th-century American politicians